In probability theory, the g-expectation is a nonlinear expectation based on a backwards stochastic differential equation (BSDE) originally developed by Shige Peng.

Definition 
, let  be  measurable. Consider the BSDE given by:

Existence and uniqueness 
Let   satisfy:
  is an -adapted process for every 
  the L2 space (where  is a norm in )
Then for any random variable  there exists a unique pair of -adapted processes  which satisfy the stochastic differential equation.

In particular, if  additionally satisfies:
  is continuous in time
  for all 
then for the terminal random variable  it follows that the solution processes  are square integrable.  Therefore  is square integrable for all times .

See also 
 Expected value
 Choquet expectation
 Risk measure – almost any time consistent convex risk measure can be written as

References 

Wiener process